Lappula is a genus of flowering plants in the borage family known generally as stickseeds. They are native to the northern hemisphere. These are annual herbs producing funnel-shaped flowers and prickly fruits. One of the best known species is the European stickseed, Lappula squarrosa, which is a notorious noxious weed.

Species include:
Lappula barbata
Lappula bracteatum
Lappula cenchrusoides - Great Plains stickseed
Lappula diploloma
Lappula marginata - margined stickseed
Lappula occidentalis - flatspine stickseed
Lappula squarrosa - European stickseed

References

External links
Jepson Manual Treatment

Boraginoideae
Boraginaceae genera
Flora of Europe
Flora of Serbia